Gerhard Huska (born 26 March 1939) is an Austrian yacht racer who competed in the 1960 Summer Olympics.

References

1939 births
Living people
Austrian male sailors (sport)
Olympic sailors of Austria
Sailors at the 1960 Summer Olympics – 5.5 Metre
Place of birth missing (living people)